Lake Towuti is a lake in East Luwu Regency, South Sulawesi province, Indonesia. Surrounded by mountains, it is the largest lake of the island of Sulawesi and one of the five lakes of the Malili Lake system (the other being Matano, and the small Mahalona, Masapi and Lontoa (Wawantoa)). A river flows from the lake to the Boni Bay. The town Laronda is located on its shore.

Ecology
Together with the other lakes in the Malili Lake system, Towuti has a large number of endemic fishes (Telmatherinid sail-fin silversides, Glossogobius and Mugilogobius gobies, Nomorhamphus halfbeaks and Oryzias ricefishes), Caridina shrimps, Parathelphusid crabs (Nautilothelphusa, Parathelphusa and Syntripsa) and Tylomelania snails.

Among these, Caridina spongicola lives on freshwater sponges, making it one of only two known commensal species of freshwater shrimp (the other is a Limnocaridina shrimp that lives in mussels in Lake Tanganyika, East Africa).

See also
 List of lakes of Indonesia

References

Towuti
Landforms of South Sulawesi